Almira Sessions (September 16, 1888 – August 3, 1974) was an American character actress of stage, screen and television. Born in Washington, D.C., her career took her through all the acting mediums of the 20th century. She appeared in over 500 films and television shows. She worked into her 80s, finally retiring shortly before her death in 1974 in Los Angeles.

Early life and career
Sessions was born into a very well-known family in Washington D.C. on September 16, 1888. A debutante, she followed her coming out party with her introduction into the acting profession, appearing in a 1909 performance of the comic operetta The Sultan of Sulu by George Ade and Nathaniel D. Mann. Her early career was spent performing in cabarets before she moved to New York City, where she began performing on the stage and on Bob Hope's radio show. During the 1930s she appeared in many stage productions, including several Broadway productions.

Film and television
While appearing on the stage in New York during the 1930s, Sessions made her film debut in Edward Sloman's 1932 film Wayward. While this marked her debut in films, it was not the true beginning to her career in film. Wayward was filmed in New York at the Paramount Publix studios. Sessions did not begin to appear regularly in feature films until eight years later, in 1940, with her appearance in Norman Taurog's Little Nellie Kelly, starring Judy Garland. During the 1930s she would occasionally appear in film shorts, such as 1935's Two Boobs in a Balloon, starring Edgar Bergen.

During her film career, which spanned four decades from the 1940s to the 1970s, she appeared in numerous notable films, including: Preston Sturges's Sullivan's Travels (1942), starring Joel McCrea and Veronica Lake; the William Wellman drama, The Ox-Bow Incident, starring Henry Fonda, Dana Andrews, and Anthony Quinn; her performance as Hattie the cook in the 1943 comedy, My Kingdom for a Cook, starring Charles Coburn, garnered her notice for her comedic talent; another Preston Sturges film, the 1944 comedy The Miracle of Morgan's Creek, with Eddie Bracken and Betty Hutton; the Rodgers and Hammerstein musical State Fair (1945); the Cole Porter biopic, Night and Day (1946), starring Cary Grant and Alexis Smith; Monsieur Verdoux, Charlie Chaplin's 1947 comedy-drama in which she had one of her infrequent featured roles; 1946 saw her dramatic performance in the film noir Fear highlighted in reviews; the iconic It's a Wonderful Life (1947), directed by Frank Capra and starring James Stewart; the Christmas classic The Bishop's Wife (1948), which stars Cary Grant, Loretta Young, and David Niven and was directed by Henry Koster; the period comedy Take Me Out to the Ball Game, starring Frank Sinatra, Gene Kelly and Esther Williams; and King Vidor's 1949 production of Ayn Rand's The Fountainhead, starring Gary Cooper and Patricia Neal.

The 1950s would see her continue appearing in numerous films, including such notable pictures as the Henry Koster classic comedy Harvey (1950), starring James Stewart; the film version of Damon Runyon's short story The Lemon Drop Kid, starring Bob Hope; 1955's Rebel Without a Cause (1955), starring James Dean and Natalie Wood; Michael Curtiz's 1956 crime drama The Scarlet Hour; and Elvis Presley's third film, Loving You (1957). The 1950s would see Sessions enter the new medium of television. Beginning with The Adventures of Kit Carson, she had guest appearances in dozens of television shows during the decade. Some of the shows she appeared in were: Adventures of Superman, The Adventures of Ozzie & Harriet, Hopalong Cassidy, Lassie, The Adventures of Rin Tin Tin, and Walt Disney's Wonderful World of Color. In 1957 Sessions appeared as Mrs. Thatcher in the TV western Cheyenne in the episode titled "The Iron Trail."

Sessions's career slowed down in the 1960s, but she continued to appear both in films and on television. Her film credits during this decade included the film adaptation of the Tennessee Williams play Summer and Smoke (1961), starring Laurence Harvey, Geraldine Page, and Rita Moreno; the 1963 comedy Under the Yum Yum Tree, with Jack Lemon, Carol Lynley, Dean Jones, and Edie Adams; the 1968 thriller, The Boston Strangler, starring Tony Curtis and Henry Fonda; and Roman Polanski's horror classic, Rosemary's Baby, starring Mia Farrow, John Cassavetes, and Ruth Gordon. Her television credits during the 1960s included: The Donna Reed Show, The Munsters, F Troop, The Andy Griffith Show - in the very last episode (Mayberry R.F.D.) as Mrs. Fletcher, and The Carol Burnett Show. While her credits in the 1970s were limited as her career wound down, the films and television shows in which she appeared well known. Her lone film credit was in the classic horror film Willard (1971), and her television credits included guest appearances on Marcus Welby, M.D., Night Gallery, and Love, American Style.

Sessions died on August 3, 1974, in Los Angeles, California. She is interred in Hollywood Forever Cemetery.

Filmography

(Per AFI database)

 Wayward  (1932)   	as Aunt Mary Lou Reed (uncredited)
 Little Nellie Kelly  (1940)   	
 Jennie  (1940)   	
 Chad Hanna  (1940)   	
 Blondie in Society  (1941)   	
 Blossoms in the Dust  (1941)   	
 Ringside Maisie  (1941)   	
 She Knew All the Answers  (1941)   	
 Three Girls About Town  (1941)   	
 Sun Valley Serenade  (1941)   	
 Sullivan's Travels  (1941)   	 as Ursula
 Blondie for Victory  (1942)   	
 I Married an Angel  (1942)   	
 The Lone Star Ranger (1942)  	
 My Sister Eileen  (1942)   	
 Obliging Young Lady  (1942)   	
 Happy Go Lucky  (1943)   	
 The Heat's On  (1943)   	
My Kingdom for a Cook (1943) 	
 The Ox-Bow Incident  (1943)   	as Miss Swanson (uncredited)
 Presenting Lily Mars  (1943)   	
 Slightly Dangerous  (1943)   	
 Young Ideas  (1943)   	
 Assignment in Brittany  (1943)   	
 Madame Curie  (1944)   	
 I Love a Soldier  (1944)   	
 Henry Aldrich's Little Secret  (1944)   	
 The Doughgirls  (1944)   	
 Dixie Jamboree  (1944)   	
 Can't Help Singing  (1944)   	
 Maisie Goes to Reno  (1944)   	
 The Miracle of Morgan's Creek  (1944)   	
 San Diego, I Love You (1944)   	
 Bathing Beauty  (1944)   	
 Nob Hill  (1945)   	
 She Wouldn't Say Yes  (1945)   	
 The Southerner  (1945)
 State Fair  (1945)   	
 Two O'Clock Courage  (1945)   	
 The Woman Who Came Back  (1945)   	
 The Diary of a Chambermaid  (1946)   	
 Do You Love Me  (1946)   	
 Fear  (1946)   	
 The Missing Lady  (1946)   	
 Night and Day  (1946)
 It's a Wonderful Life  (1946) as Potter's Secretary (uncredited)
 Cross My Heart  (1947)   	
 For the Love of Rusty  (1947)   	
 I Wonder Who's Kissing Her Now?  (1947)   	
 Love and Learn  (1947)   	
 Merton of the Movies  (1947)   	
 Monsieur Verdoux  (1947) as Lena Couvais  	 	
 Apartment for Peggy  (1948)   	
 Arthur Takes Over  (1948)   	
 The Bishop's Wife  (1948)   	
 The Bride Goes Wild  (1948)   	
 Cass Timberlane  (1948)   	
 Good Sam  (1948)   	
 Julia Misbehaves  (1948) as Woman in street (uncredited)   	
 Family Honeymoon  (1949)   	
 The Fountainhead  (1949)   	
 Ladies of the Chorus  (1949)   	
 Night Unto Night  (1949)   	
 Roseanna McCoy  (1949)   	
 Take Me Out to the Ball Game  (1949)   	
 Black Hand  (1950)   	
 The Blazing Sun  (1950)   	
 Fancy Pants  (1950)   	
 Joe Palooka in Humphrey Takes a Chance  (1950)   	
 Kill the Umpire  (1950)   	
 Montana  (1950)   	
 The Old Frontier  (1950)   	
 Please Believe Me  (1950)   	
 Summer Stock  (1950)   	
 Tarnished  (1950)   	
 Harvey  (1950)   	
 Here Comes the Groom  (1951)   	
 The Lemon Drop Kid  (1951)   	
 Oh! Susanna  (1951)   	
 Oklahoma Annie  (1952)   	
 Wagons West (1952)   	
 The Affairs of Dobie Gillis  (1953)   	
 Code Two  (1953)  
 Paris Model (1953)
 Sweethearts on Parade  (1953)   	
 Ride, Vaquero!  (1953)   	
 The Sun Shines Bright  (1953)   	
 Forever Female  (1954)   	
 Hell's Outpost  (1954)   	
 It's Always Fair Weather  (1955)   	
 The Prodigal  (1955)   	
 Rebel Without a Cause  (1955) as Old Lady Teacher (uncredited)   	
 Calling Homicide  (1956)   	
 The Scarlet Hour  (1956)   	
 Loving You  (1957)   	
 Andy Hardy Comes Home  (1958)   	
 The Badlanders  (1958)   	
 Summer and Smoke  (1961)   	
 Paradise Alley  (1962)   	
 Under the Yum Yum Tree  (1963)   	
 The Boston Strangler  (1968)
 Rosemary's Baby  (1968) as Mrs. Sabatini (uncredited)  	
 Willard  (1971)

References

External links
 
 
 

1888 births
1974 deaths
20th-century American actresses
Actresses from Washington, D.C.
American debutantes
American film actresses
American radio actresses
American stage actresses
American television actresses
Burials at Hollywood Forever Cemetery
Vaudeville performers